Arriva Buses Wales is a bus operator providing services in northern Wales and Chester in northern England. It is a subsidiary of Arriva UK Bus.

History

Crosville Motor Services was formed in 1919 and operated services in Wales and northern England. It became a subsidiary of National Bus Company before its Welsh operations were split into Crosville Cymru in preparation for sale in 1987 through a management buyout.

In 1989 Crosville Cymru was sold to National Express. In 1991 it was sold again to British Bus.

In August 1996 British Bus was purchased by the Cowie Group. It traded as Arriva Cymru until February 2002, when it merged with Arriva North West to form Arriva North West & Wales.

In August 2008 Arriva purchased routes 9 and 9A with seven buses from KMP.

In January 2009, Arriva North West & Wales was split, with the Welsh operations being managed by a new management team based at Llandudno Junction depot.

The Crosville Cymru / Crosville Wales Limited name exists today but not with Arriva. It is a dormant company and is registered in Wales.

Services
Arriva Buses Wales operates services across the north of Wales from Holyhead to Chester and Wrexham. During the summer months open top buses operate services in Rhyl.

Arriva Buses Wales previously operated some Trawscambria services.

As from July 2016 several ex GHA Coaches routes have been taken on by Arriva Buses Wales after GHA Coaches went into administration.
They are as follows:
5 Wrexham to Llangollen
82 Chester to Northwich
DB1 Chester to Mold
DB2 Chester to Saltney
DB4 Chester to Deeside
X51 Wrexham to Denbigh (was X50 with GHA)

They also ran SP1/2 between Ellesmere Port and Mold for a short period.

Depots
Arriva Buses Wales operates four depots:
Bangor - Llandygai Industrial  Estate, Llandygai (headquarters)
Hawarden (near Chester) - Manor Lane Industrial Estate, Manor Lane
Rhyl - Ffynnongroew  Road
Wrexham - Berse Road, Caego

There are also smaller outstations or sub-depots at other locations, including Llandudno, Holyhead and Amlwch (outstations of Bangor). Caelloi Motors share their depot with Arriva in Pwllheli.

The former regional headquarters and depot at Llandudno Junction closed in April 2013. Aberystwyth depot, along with its outstations at New Quay and Lampeter closed on 21 December 2013, along with Dolgellau, latterly an outstation of Wrexham depot. Councillors and AMs criticised the short notice given by Arriva, leading to fears that communities could be left without bus services; however, other operators took over the running of the routes.

Fleet
As of February 2016 the fleet consists of 192 vehicles. The majority of the fleet is single deck (68%) and is entirely low floor. There is a wide range of different types in the fleet although DAF and VDL chassis are the most common accounting for 41% of all vehicles in the fleet.

During March 2010 Arriva Buses Wales announced that the fleet was 100% low floor (except open-tops and college/school duties), although high-floor Van Hool coaches were subsequently brought in to replace Optare Tempos on Aberystwyth-Cardiff duties.

Single deck
Dennis Darts, which made up around half the fleet in 2011, had been reduced to just four vehicles by October 2017, all of the 8.8-metre MPD variety. More recent deliveries have been VDL SB120 and SB200 with Wright Cadet, Commander and Pulsar/Pulsar 2 bodywork, as well as Optare Solos of differing lengths. Other types operated include a pair of Optare Versas; a Wright Eclipse bodied Volvo B7RLE, one of seven acquired from K.M.P. in 2008; and fourteen Alexander Dennis Enviro200s which were delivered to Bangor, Wrexham and Rhyl depots in 2015.

Double deck
The most common double deck type in the fleet is the Alexander Dennis Enviro400 - all 40 of which are currently operated on Sapphire services based at Wrexham, Chester and Rhyl depots respectively. The majority of these were delivered brand new - however eleven of these were refurbished after being released from Arriva North West.

Other double deck types in the fleet are the Wright Gemini 2 bodied VDL DB300 which are operated exclusively on Cymru Coastliner services from Rhyl depot and eleven DAF DB250RS. Six of these are East Lancs Myllennium Lowlander bodied (these being cascaded from Arriva Midlands to replace Volvo Olympians at Bangor) whilst the remaining five are former Arriva London Alexander ALX400 bodied examples which have been converted to open top to replace Leyland Olympians to operate the Roller Coaster service between Llandudno and Prestatyn.

See also
List of bus operators of the United Kingdom

References

External links

Arriva Buses Wales website

1919 establishments in England
Wales
British companies established in 1919
Bus operators in Wales
Transport in Cheshire